The Bicentennial of the Independence of the Republic of Paraguay is a group of festivities that took place in Paraguay and Paraguayan communities abroad, on the occasion of the celebration of 200 years of Independence of Paraguay from Spanish Empire in 1811. The activities in relation to Bicentennial of Paraguay took off in 2010 and culminated in late 2011.

Paraguayan independence

Preparations for the festivities

Organising Committee for the commemoration 
The National Commission for the Commemoration of the Bicentennial of the Independence of the Republic of Paraguay, is a body created by Law No. 3,495 and is responsible for the planning and implementation of projects to celebrate the Bicentennial of National Independence. It consists of a Board, a Standing Advisory Committee and an Executive Secretariat.

See also 

 Argentina Bicentennial 
List of festivals in Paraguay

References

External links 

 Official Web Site: . 
 Bicentenario Paraguayo Desfile Militar: http://www.yluux.com/2011/05/16/bicentenario-paraguayo-desfile-militar/

Bicentennial anniversaries
2011 in Paraguay
Festivals in Paraguay